Warschau is the third live album by Swedish black metal band Marduk. It was recorded in Warsaw, Poland in 2005 and released on January 23, 2006 by Regain Records, to commemorate "15 years of Marduk." A limited edition packaging with a bonus DVD of live performances was released later that year, on July 17. Warschau was the last live Marduk album to feature Emil Dragutinovic on drums.

Track listing

Trivia
 Warschau is titled after a song of the same name which appeared on Marduk's 2004 album Plague Angel. It means Warsaw in German.
Two song titles on the back cover of the CD are spelled incorrectly: "The Hangman of Prague" is spelled "The Hangman of Prauge", and "Slay the Nazarene" is spelled as "Slay the Nazarine".

Personnel
Marduk
 Mortuus – vocals
 Morgan Steinmeyer Håkansson – guitar
 Magnus "Devo" Andersson – bass
 Emil Dragutinovic – drums

2006 live albums
2006 video albums
Live video albums
Marduk (band) live albums
Marduk (band) video albums